Issahaku Salia is a Ghanaian politician and administrator. He served as a member of parliament for the Wa East constituency in the Upper West from 7 January 1993 to 6 January 2005. He also once served as  the Upper West Regional Minister.

Early life and education 
Issahaku Salia was born on 15 June 1952 in Manwe in the Upper West Region of Ghana. He attended the Green Hill University (now Ghana Institute of Management and Public Administration (GIMPA)), where he  obtained his Diploma in Public Administration, and the University of Ghana where he obtained his bachelor  of Science degree Political Science. Salia is still alive.

Politics 
He was a member of the 1st, 2nd and 3rd parliaments of the 4th republic of Ghana.

1992 election 
He was first elected into Parliament on the ticket of the National Democratic Congress to represent the Wa East Constituency in the Upper West Region of Ghana during the 1992 Ghanaian parliamentary election. He assumed office as a member of the first parliament of the fourth republic of Ghana on 7 January 1993.

1996 election 
He became a member of the 2nd parliament on 7 January 1997 after he was pronounced winner at the 1996 Ghanaian general election having defeated Boyela Insah of the New Patriotic Party. He obtained 56.70% of the total votes cast which is equivalent to 22,078 votes while his opposition claimed 16.60% which is equivalent to 6,445 votes.

2000 election 
He was elected into parliament of the ticket of the National Democratic congress during the 2000 Ghanaian General Election representing the Wa East constituency in the Upper West Region of Ghana.

He polled 14,278 votes out of 25,795 votes cast representing 55.40%  He was  defeated by Bayon Godfrey Tangu,a New Patriotic Party member during the 2004 General Elections.

He was introduced by the vice president on 1 August 2010 to the chiefs and people of the Region as the Upper West Regional minister.

Career 
Salia is a former member of parliament for the Wa East Constituency in the Upper West Region of Ghana. He is also an administrator.

Personal life 
Salia is a Muslim.

References 

Living people
Ghanaian MPs 2001–2005
1952 births
Ghanaian academic administrators
National Democratic Congress (Ghana) politicians
Ghanaian Muslims
People from Upper West Region
Ghanaian MPs 1997–2001